The  Iowa Barnstormers season was the 14th season for the franchise, and their tenth in the Arena Football League. The team was coached by Mike Hohensee and played their home games at the Wells Fargo Arena. The Barnstormers lost their last six games of the season, and failed to reach the playoffs for the fifth consecutive season, finishing with a 6–12 record.

Standings

Schedule
The Barnstormers began the season on March 15, on the road against the Spokane Shock. Their final regular season game took place on July 26 at home against the San Jose SaberCats.

Roster

References

Iowa Barnstormers
Iowa Barnstormers
Iowa Barnstormers seasons